The Niagara Purple Eagles are athletics teams that represent Niagara University in college sports. Part of the NCAA's Division I, the Purple Eagles field 18 varsity level teams. The Purple Eagles are members of the Metro Atlantic Athletic Conference and Atlantic Hockey. Between 1946 and 1958, Niagara was a member of the Western New York Little Three Conference.

In 2012, the women's ice hockey program was replaced by women's track and field.

Teams

Club teams 
Teams competing at the club level are:
Men's ice hockey competes in the Northeast Collegiate Hockey League of the ACHA.
Men's rugby competes in the Upstate Small College Rugby Conference (West Division) of the NSCRO.
Women's rugby competes in the West Region Upstate New York Collegiate Rugby Conference of the NSCRO.
Men's lacrosse competes in the Empire West D2 of the NCLL.  
Men's roller hockey  competes in Division IV Eastern Collegiate Roller Hockey Association of the NCRHA.

Former sports

Football 
Niagara first played football in 1897 and continued until suspending operations after the 1909 season. The Purple Eagles returned for the 1914 season and kept playing college football until World War II made the 1941 season Niagara's last until 1946. For the third time, the Purple Eagles suspended their team after the 1950 season, only to return in 1967. After 20 seasons of play that had seven winless seasons with six occurring in a span of seven years, the Purple Eagles dropped football for the fourth and final time after the 1987 season. Over the span of 67 seasons, the team went won 182 games, lost 205 games, and had 31 ties. In the 1975 club season they played the Heritage Bowl in Worcester, Massachusetts, losing to Assumption College (27-7). The Eagles had 37 seasons in which they finished with more wins and ties than losses, though the Purple Eagles finished on an 18-game losing streak in over three seasons, their last win occurring in October 1985.

The most wins they had in a season was 1902, in which they went 9–3–1, while the most losses they had in a season was 1922, when they finished 1–8–1.

Notable players
 Tom Cahill
 Dan DeSantis
 Bob Stefik
Chris Cappanola

Women's ice hockey

Rivalries 

Niagara's fiercest rivals include:
St. Bonaventure Bonnies
Canisius Golden Griffins

All-Americans 
Calvin Murphy, 1970 (men's basketball)
 Tania Pinelli, 2002 (women's hockey)
Juan Mendez, 2005 (men's basketball)
 Allison Rutledge, 2007 (women's hockey)
Paul Zanette, 2011 (men's hockey)

NCAA postseason appearances 
Men's Hockey: 2013, 2008, 2004, 2000
Women's volleyball: 2011, 2010, 2009
Men's basketball: 2007, 2005, 1970
Women's Tennis: 2005, 2003
Women's soccer: 2006
Women's Hockey: 2002
Softball: 1998
Men's soccer: 2012

Metro Atlantic Athletic Conference tournament championships 
Women's Volleyball: 2011, 2010, 2009
Men's basketball: 2007, 2005
Women's Soccer: 2006
Women's Tennis: 2005, 2003
Softball: 1998
Men's Swimming: 1994
Women’s Swimming: 2022
Men's soccer: 2012

Metro Atlantic Athletic Conference regular-season titles 
Women's Volleyball: 2011, 2010
Women's Tennis: 2009, 2003
Men's Basketball: 2013, 2005, 2001, 1999

College Hockey America Tournament championships 
Men's Hockey: 2008, 2004, 2000

College Hockey America regular-season titles 
Men's Hockey: 2007, 2006, 2000

Atlantic Hockey Association regular-season titles 
Men's Hockey: 2013

References

External links